The Slovakia national under-18 football team, controlled by the Slovak Football Association, is Slovakia's national under 18 football team and is considered to be a feeder team for the Slovakia U19 team.

Recent results

Current squad 
The following players have been called up for 2014 Slovakia Cup.

Staff

See also
Slovakia national football team
Slovakia national under-21 football team
Slovakia national under-19 football team
Slovakia national under-17 football team
Slovakia national under-16 football team
Slovakia national under-15 football team

External links
 Slovak Football Association 
  

European national under-18 association football teams
under-18